The longspurs, genus Calcarius, are a group of birds in the family Calcariidae. The name refers to the long claw on the hind toe of each foot. The genus formerly included the thick-billed longspur, Rhyncophanes mccownii, which is now placed in a separate genus.

These are chunky ground-feeding birds with long wings which are usually seen in open areas. Males declare ownership of a territory by singing during short flights over it. The male's breeding plumage is much brighter than his winter plumage. These birds gather in large flocks in winter. The longspurs are all found in North America; the Lapland longspur, or Lapland bunting, is also found in Europe and Asia.

Species
The species are:

The genus name Calcarius is from Latin calcaria, "spurs".

References

Calcariidae